A guardhouse (also known as a watch house, guard building, guard booth, guard shack, security booth, security building, or sentry building) is a building used to house personnel and security equipment. Guardhouses have historically been dormitories for sentries or guards, and places where sentries not posted to sentry posts wait "on call", but are more recently staffed by a contracted security company. Some guardhouses also function as jails.

Modern guardhouses
In 21st century commercial, industrial, institutional, governmental, or residential facilities, Guardhouses are generally placed at the entrance as checkpoints for securing, monitoring and maintaining access control into the secured facility. In the case of small to mid-sized facilities, generally, the entire physical security envelope is controlled from the Guardhouse.

One of the general orders of a sentry in the United States Navy and Marine corps is to "Repeat all calls more distant from the guardhouse than my own." Guardhouses thus serve as central communications hubs for outlying sentry posts, being where the Corporal of the Guard is stationed. When sentries are relieved by their replacements, the sentry stationed at the Guardhouse, designated "No. 1", is conventionally relieved first.

Modern guardhouses are manufactured with welded, galvanized steel construction, insulated, include heat and light, have 360 degree visibility, and can also be bullet resistant. These guardhouses keep security guards comfortable as well as secure. The first modern guardhouse was manufactured by Par-Kut International in 1954. In the 21st century, guardhouses have provided more options such as exterior floodlights, reflective bullet resistant glass, gun ports, elevated platforms, highly mobile trailer mounting, anti fatigue floor mats, dimmable interior light, and a built in bathroom.

Historical guardhouses
In the Fortress of Louisbourg in the 18th century, Guardhouses were where sentries were stationed to eat and sleep between periods of sentry duty at the 21 sentry posts around the town. The town had five Guardhouses (the Dauphine Gate, the townside entrance to the King's Bastion, the Queen's Gate, the Maurepas Gate, and the Pièce de la Grave), and whilst not sleeping sentries would be "on call" from those Guardhouses at need.

In the Guardhouse at Fort Scott National Historic Site, typical furnishings for guard quarters included benches, tables, shelves, a platform bed for the men resting between assignments, arms racks, a fireplace or stove, and leather buckets (used for firefighting - another duty of guards). Prison cells were unfurnished, containing simply a slop bucket and iron rings on walls for the attachment of shackles.

See also 
 Gatehouse
 Neue Wache
 Kōban
 The Guardhouse, a mountain in Montana
 Guard tower
 Sentry box

References

Further reading 
  - a description of the guardhouse at Colonial Williamsburg
 
  - a description of the guardhouse at Arsenal Technical High School, tracing its history from being a combined guardhouse and jail for the U.S. Army barracks through being a school "beanery" to its current function as a school security office
  - an archaeological report on the guardhouse at the Macquarie Street entrance of the Lancer Barracks in Parramatta, New South Wales
  - an extract from the Fort Concho Medical History Record of May 1871, describing in detail the now nonexistent guardhouse